Blick am Abend was a German free evening newspaper published in Switzerland and based in Zürich. It existed between 2008 and 2018.

History and profile
Blick am Abend was first published on 1 June 2008 as a successor to the afternoon free daily Heute.

Blick am Abend, based in Zürich, was a free newspaper owned by Ringier. It was an evening newspaper published in tabloid format. Peter Röthlisberger was the editor-in-chief of the daily. Its sister newspaper was Blick, a leading daily in the country. 

In 2008 Blick am Abend started a biweekly legal column which answers the reader questions. Until 2009 the daily had editions in Zurich, Berne and Basle. St. Gallen and Luzern/Zug editions were started in 2009. In December 2013 the paper launched its online edition.

The audited circulation of Blick am Abend in 2008 was 211,000 copies. The paper had a circulation of 225,226 copies in 2009. Its was 329,418 copies in 2010, and its readership was 604,000 the same year.

Blick am Abend discontinued in December 2018.

See also
 List of newspapers in Switzerland

References

External links
 

2008 establishments in Switzerland
2018 disestablishments in Switzerland
Defunct free daily newspapers
Defunct newspapers published in Switzerland
Evening newspapers
German-language newspapers published in Switzerland
Newspapers established in 2008
Newspapers published in Zürich
Publications disestablished in 2018